Benedetto Giustiniani (5 June  1554 – 27 March 1621) was an Italian clergyman who was made a cardinal in the consistory of 16 November 1586 by Pope Sixtus V.

He participated in the papal conclaves of 1592 and 1621. From 1615 to 1620 he was bishop of the Sabina and from 1620 to 1621 of Porto. Either he or his brother Vincenzo commissioned the 1621-1629 painting of Saint John the Evangelist by Domenichino. His postmortem inventory contained 280 paintings.

Episcopal succession

References

External links

Benedetto Giustiniani in the Historical Archives of the Pontifical Gregorian University

1554 births
1621 deaths
16th-century Italian cardinals
Benedetto
Clergy from Chios
17th-century Italian cardinals